The  is an annual award for "outstanding contribution to the advancement of research in fundamental biology." The Prize, although it is not always awarded to a biologist, is one of the most prestigious honours a natural scientist can receive. There are no restrictions on the nationality of the recipient.

Past laureates include John B. Gurdon, Motoo Kimura, Edward O. Wilson, Ernst Mayr, Thomas Cavalier-Smith, Yoshinori Ohsumi and many other great biologists in the world.

Information

The International Prize of Biology was created in 1985 to commemorate the 60-year reign of Emperor Shōwa of Japan and his longtime interest in and support of "Biology." The selection and award of the prize is managed by the Japan Society for the Promotion of Science. The laureate is awarded a beautiful medal, 10 million yen, and an international symposium on the scientist's area of research is held in Tokyo.  The prize ceremony is held in the presence of Emperor of Japan.

The first International Prize for Biology was awarded to E. J. H. Corner, who was a prominent scientist in the field of systematic biology, because Emperor Shōwa was interested in and worked on this field for long time.

Criteria
The Prize is awarded in accordance with the following criteria:
The Prize shall be made by the Committee every year, commencing in 1985.
The Prize shall consist of a medal and a prize of ten million (10,000,000) yen.
There shall be no restrictions on the nationality of the recipient.
The Prize shall be awarded to an individual who, in the judgment of the members of the Committee, has made an outstanding contribution to the advancement of research in fundamental biology.
The specialty within the field of biology for which the Prize will be awarded shall be decided upon annually by the Committee.
The Committee shall be advised on suitable candidates for the Prize by a selection committee, which will consist of Japanese and overseas members.
The selection committee shall invite nominations of candidates from such relevant individuals and organizations at home and abroad as the selection committee may deem appropriate.
The selection committee shall submit to the Committee a report containing recommendations of the candidate for the Prize and supporting statement.
The Prize shall be presented every year. In conjunction with the ceremony, an international symposium is held in which the Prize recipient is invited to give a special lecture.

Background

The Emperors of Japan have been famous for their special interest in science, in particular biology. Emperor Akihito has strived over many years to advance the study taxonomy of gobioid fishes.

Laureates
Source: Japan Society for the Promotion of Science

See also
 Japan Society for the Promotion of Science
 List of biology awards

External links
International Prize for Biology

References

Academic awards
Awards established in 1985
Biology awards
Hirohito
International awards
Japanese science and technology awards
1985 establishments in Japan